Dolon Southwest was a dispersal bomber base in Semipalatinsk, Kazakhstan, located 43 km south-west of Dolon (air base).  It was part of the Far East command of Soviet Air Forces Long Range Aviation.

A Central Intelligence Agency document listed the coordinates of the airfield while referencing a 1968 deployment of 21 Tupolev Tu-16 "Badger" bombers, the first deployment of this aircraft at the airfield.  Dolon was listed as having eight support buildings, a refueling facility, an instrument landing system, and ground controlled approach (GCA).

Almost no trace remains of the base.

References

Airports in Kazakhstan
Soviet Air Force bases
Military installations closed in the 1990s